Virtua Tennis Challenge is a sports game developed and published by Sega for Android and iOS. It was first released in 2012, with Sega later releasing it as a part of its Sega Forever mobile game platform in 2017.

Games mode 
Exhibition Match

The users play it in singles or doubles. They choose between all the available players and the World Tour profiles that they created. Different options can be configured such as the stadium, difficulty, among others.

SPT World Tour

In it, the users create a player, choose their characteristics and game skills, sign up for the different tournaments available every day throughout the season, win sponsorships throughout the career and compete until they are number 1 in the professional ranking.

Multiplayer

The users play games against other people using bluetooth.

Training

The players improve the skills by training against their strongest rival.

Tournaments 
The game contains a total of 18 tournaments available for SPT World Tour mode.

Main Championships (Grand Slams)

  Melbourne - Hard (Australian Open)
  Paris - Clay (Roland Garros)
  London - Grass (Wimbledon)
  New York - Hard (US Open)

Final Championship of the SPT (ATP World Tour Finals)

  Chicago - Hard

SPT 1000 Masters (ATP Masters 1000)

  Dubai - Hard
  Madrid - Clay
  Prague - Grass
  Los Angeles - Indoor

SPT 500 Championship Advantage (ATP 500)

  Shanghai - Hard
  Tokyo - Indoor
  Cairo - Hard
  Stockholm - Hard
  Vancouver - Grass

SPT 250 Aspirants (ATP 250)

  Washington - Hard
  Acapulco - Hard
  Hamburg - Clay
  London - Grass

References

2012 video games
Android (operating system) games
IOS games
Tennis video games
Video games developed in Japan
Virtua Tennis
Multiplayer and single-player video games